is a railway station in the city of Ichinomiya, Aichi Prefecture, Japan, operated by Meitetsu.

Lines
Shin Kisogawa Station is served by the Meitetsu Nagoya Main Line and is 91.2 kilometers from the terminus of the line at Toyohashi Station.

Station layout
The station has two island platforms with passing loops, connected by a footbridge. The station has automated ticket machines, Manaca automated turnstiles and is staffed.

Platforms

Adjacent stations

Station history
Shin-Kisogawa Station was opened on April 29, 1935. The station building was destroyed by a fire in 1965 and rebuilt in 1966.

Passenger statistics
In fiscal 2013, the station was used by an average of 5848 passengers daily.

Surrounding area
 former Kisogawa Town Hall
 Site of Kuroda Castle

See also
 List of Railway Stations in Japan

References

External links

 Official web page 

Railway stations in Japan opened in 1935
Railway stations in Aichi Prefecture
Stations of Nagoya Railroad
Ichinomiya, Aichi